Daniel Feller is an American historian, currently a Professor emeritus at University of Tennessee.

Feller earned his Ph.D. from the University of Wisconsin in 1981. His chief interests include early and mid 19th century American history. He is the author of The Public Lands in Jacksonian Politics and The Jacksonian Promise: America, 1815-1840. Since 2004, Feller and a team of historians have been collaborating on a project to compile the writings of Andrew Jackson in a multi-volume series, The Papers of Andrew Jackson.

Books 
 1984: The Public Lands in Jacksonian Politics 
 1995: The Jacksonian Promise: America, 1815-1840

See also 
American Historiography

References

External links 
 https://www.c-span.org/person/?danielfeller

Living people
University of Tennessee faculty
21st-century American historians
American male non-fiction writers
University of Wisconsin–Madison alumni
Year of birth missing (living people)
21st-century American male writers